Lasiograptidae is an extinct family of graptolites.

Genera
List of genera from Maletz (2014):

†Arachniograptus Ross & Berry, 1963
†Archiretiolites Eisenack, 1935
†Brevigraptus Mitchell, 1988
†Hallograptus Lapworth, 1876a
†Lasiograptus Lapworth, 1873
†Neurograptus Elles & Wood, 1908
†Nymphograptus Elles & Wood, 1908
†Orthoretiolites Whittington, 1954
†Paraplegmatograptus Mu & Lin, 1984
†Phormograptus Whittington, 1955
†Pipiograptus Whittington, 1955
†Plegmatograptus Elles & Wood, 1908
†Sunigraptus Mu, 1993 in Mu et al. (1993)
†Tysanograptus Elles & Wood, 1908
†Yangzigraptus Mu, 1983 in Yang et al. (1983)
†Yinograptus Mu, 1962 in Mu & Chen (1962)

References

Graptolites
Prehistoric hemichordate families